Yanacancha District is one of thirteen districts of the province Pasco in Peru.

References